Josef Michl (born 12 March 1939 in Prague) is a Czechoslovak-American Chemist.

Early life and education
Michl was born in Prague, which was then the capital of the short-lived Second Czechoslovak Republic (1938–1939), in 12 March 1939. This was a few days before Nazi Germany incorporated Prague and the rest of the Czech part of the country as the protectorate of Bohemia and Moravia.

Michl began studying chemistry at Charles University in Prague in 1956 and earned a Master's degree in 1961 under V. Horák and P. Zuman. In 1965 he earned Czechoslovak Academy of Sciences a Ph.D. under Rudolf Zahradník. He worked as a Postdoctoral researcher from 1965 to 1970 for R. S. Becker at the University of Houston, for Michael J. S. Dewar at the University of Texas at Austin and with F. E. Harris at the University of Utah. In the meantime he was research assistant at the Institute for Physical Chemistry of the Czechoslovak Academy of Sciences in 1967–1968 and assistant professor of Jan Linderberg at the Department of Chemistry at the Aarhus University in 1968–1969.

1970 Michl received his first independent professorship at the University of Utah at Salt Lake City (Research Associate Professor), in 1971 he became an associate professor and in 1975 he received a full professorship. In 1986 Michl moved to the University of Texas at Austin, but remained connected to the University of Utah as an adjunct professor. In 1991 he received a call to the University of Colorado Boulder. Since 2006, Michl has also worked as a research director for the Institute of Organic Chemistry and Biochemistry of the Czech Academy of Sciences.

Career 
Michl has made important contributions to numerous areas of chemistry during his career: theoretical and experimental aspects of organic photochemistry, magnetic circular dichroism, chemistry and theory of biradicals and biradicaloids, electronic and vibrational spectroscopy with polarized light, silicon chemistry and electronic structure, theory and experiment of sputtered frozen gases, properties and theory of organic Reaction intermediates, cluster-ions, molecular building blocks for supramolecular structures and boron chemistry.

Michl was editor of the ACS journal Chemical Reviews from 1984 to 2014. He is co-author of five textbooks on Photochemistry and Polarization spectroscopy, is author of more than 570 scientific publications and holds 11 patents.

Awards 

 1971–1975 Alfred P. Sloan Foundation Research Fellowship
 1984/85 Guggenheim Fellowship
 1986 Member of the National Academy of Sciences
 1990 Honorary doctorate from Georgetown University
 1992 Schrödinger Medal of the World Association of Theoretical and Computational Chemists
 1994 Heyrovský Medal from Czech Academy of Sciences
 1995 Gold medal from  Charles University
 1995 Honorary member of the Learned Society of the Czech Republic
 1996 Honorary doctorate from Universität Pardubice
 1999 Member of the American Academy of Arts and Sciences
 2001 James Flack Norris Award from American Chemical Society
 2001 Otto Wichterle prize from Czech chemical society
 2004 Honorary doctorate from Masaryk University

External links

 Prof. Josef Michl on encyklopedie.brna.cz
 Michl Research Group on the University of Colorado Boulder website
 Prof. Josef Michl, Ph.D. on the IOCB website

References 

1939 births
Living people
Members of the International Academy of Quantum Molecular Science
Fellows of the American Academy of Arts and Sciences
Members of the United States National Academy of Sciences
University of Colorado Boulder faculty
University of Texas at Austin faculty
University of Utah faculty
21st-century chemists
20th-century chemists
Schrödinger Medal recipients
Institute of Organic Chemistry and Biochemistry of the CAS
Charles University alumni